The 1996–97 Euro Hockey Tour was the first season of the Euro Hockey Tour. The season consisted of three tournaments, the Karjala Tournament, Channel One Cup, and the Sweden Hockey Games. The games Canada participated in did not count towards the final standings of the tournament.

Tournaments

Karjala Tournament

Izvestia Trophy

Sweden Hockey Games

Final standings

References
Euro Hockey Tour website

Euro Hockey Tour
1996–97 in European ice hockey
1996–97 in Canadian ice hockey
1996–97 in Russian ice hockey
1996–97 in Czech ice hockey
1996–97 in Swedish ice hockey
1996–97 in Finnish ice hockey